Jordan Thomas Barnett (born 20 October 1999) is an English professional footballer who plays as a left back and midfielder for  club Buxton.

Having played youth football for Sheffield Wednesday and Barnsley, Barnett started his senior career at Penistone Church before joining Burnley on a one-year deal in 2017 to play youth football but was released at the end of the season. He returned to Barnsley in 2018, but was released in 2020 without making a first-team appearance. After a short spell with Pontefract Collieries, he joined Oldham Athletic in September 2020 and made his debut for the club later that month.

Early life
Born in Penistone, Barnett attended Penistone Grammar School in Penistone and later Barnsley College in Barnsley.

Club career
After playing academy football for Sheffield Wednesday and Barnsley, being released by the latter at the age of 15. Barnett started his senior career at Penistone Church before signing for Premier League club Burnley on a one-year deal in October 2017. He was released by Burnley at the end of the season.

He returned to Barnsley on a one-year deal in July 2018. His contract was extended by a further year at the end of the season, but Barnett was released at the end of the 2019–20 season following the expiry of his contract.

Barnett signed for Pontefract Collieries in summer 2020, but left to join League Two side Oldham Athletic on 1 September 2020 on a deal until January 2021. Barnett made his debut for Oldham as a substitute in an EFL Cup tie against Carlisle United on 5 September 2020, before making his league debut later that month in a 3–2 defeat at home to Crawley Town.

Following the expiry of his contract at Oldham, he joined Notts County on 1 February 2021 on a deal until the end of the season.

After his release by Notts County, Barnett signed for fellow National League side Yeovil Town. At the end of the 2021–22 season, Barnett was released by Yeovil following the expiry of his contract.

On 5 August 2022, Barnett signed for Northern Premier League Premier Division side Matlock Town. In January 2023, he reunited with former Matlock manager Craig Elliott at National League North club Buxton.

Career statistics

References

1999 births
Living people
English footballers
People from Penistone
Footballers from South Yorkshire
Association football fullbacks
Association football midfielders
People educated at Penistone Grammar School
People educated at Barnsley College
Sheffield Wednesday F.C. players
Barnsley F.C. players
Penistone Church F.C. players
Burnley F.C. players
Pontefract Collieries F.C. players
Oldham Athletic A.F.C. players
Notts County F.C. players
Yeovil Town F.C. players
Matlock Town F.C. players
Buxton F.C. players
English Football League players
National League (English football) players
Northern Premier League players